Lecomte is a French surname.

Lecomte
 Lecomte (horse), American racehorse 1850
 Lecomte Stakes, American graded horse race
 Lecomte (archer), archer in 1900 Olympics
 Amine Lecomte (born 1990), Qatar international footballer
 Benjamin Lecomte (born 1991), French footballer
 Benoît Lecomte (born 1967), French swimmer
 Bernard Lecomte (businessman) (born 1943), French businessman 
 Bernard Lecomte (writer) (born 1949), French writer and journalist 
 Felix Lecomte (1737-1817), French sculptor
 Gerard Lecomte (1926-1997), French professor of Arabic and other Eastern Languages 
 Georges Lecomte (1867-1958), French writer, member of the French Academy
 Hippolyte Lecomte (1791-1857), painter of French history 
 Isabelle Lecomte (born 1967), Belgian writer 
 Manu Lecomte (born 1995), Belgian basketball player in the Israeli Basketball Premier League
 Marcel Lecomte  (1900-1966), Belgian writer 
 Paul Henri Lecomte (1856-1934), French botanist
 Tristan Lecomte, French founder of fair trade product importers Alter Eco
 Loana Lecomte French cross-country and mountain bike cyclist.

Complex names
 Jean-Jules-Antoine Lecomte du Nouy (1842-1923), French painter and sculptor 
 Pierre Lecomte du Noüy (1883-1947), French mathematician, biophysicist, writer and philosopher
 Roger Gilbert-Lecomte (1907-1943), French writer